Otto Karl Ladislaus zur Strassen (9 May 1869, in Berlin – 21 April 1961, in Oberstedten) was a German zoologist. An advocate of Darwinism, his primary focus was concerned with biological morphology and developmental mechanics. 

Otto was the son of sculptor Melchior Anton and his wife Cecilia. He studied natural sciences at the Universities of Leipzig and Freiburg, obtaining his doctorate in 1892 at Leipzig with a dissertation on Bradynema rigidum. After graduation, he furthered his education in Naples and in Russia. In 1901 he became an associate professor of specialized zoology at Leipzig, later working as a full professor of zoology at the University of Frankfurt am Main (1914–1935). In 1922/23 he served as university rector.

In 1898/99 he took part in the first German Tiefsee-Expedition (deep-sea expedition) aboard the Valdivia. From 1909 to 1934, he was director of the Senckenberg Museum in Frankfurt am Main.

Written works 
Zur Strassen was editor of "Brehms Tierleben" (completely revised 4th edition, 1911–1918). The following are a list of some of his noteworthy written efforts.
 Embryonalentwicklung der Ascaris megalocephala, 1896 – Embryonic development of Ascaris megalocephala.
 Ueber die Mechanik der Epithelbildung, 1903 – On the mechanics of epithelialization.
 Anthraconema, eine neue Gattung freilebender Nematoden, 1904 – Anthraconema, a new genus of free-living nematode. 
 Die Geschichte der Riesen von Ascaris megalocephala als Grundlage zu einer Entwicklungsmechanik dieser Spezies, Stuttgart 1906 – History on the gigantism of Ascaris megalocephala as a basis for developmental mechanics of the species. 
 "Animal behavior and development", (published in English, 1909).
 Plastisch wirkende Augenflecke und die "Geschlechtliche Zuchtwahl", Jena 1935 – Plastic-looking eye spots and "sexual selection".
 Neue Beiträge zur Entwicklungsmechanik der Nematoden, Stuttgart 1959 – New contributions towards the developmental mechanics of nematodes.

References 

1869 births
1961 deaths
19th-century German zoologists
Academic staff of Goethe University Frankfurt
Leipzig University alumni
Academic staff of Leipzig University
Scientists from Berlin
University of Freiburg alumni
20th-century German zoologists